Matej Radan (born 13 May 1990) is a Slovenian football goalkeeper who plays for Jurovski Dol.

Honours
Maribor
Slovenian Championship: 2010–11, 2011–12, 2012–13
Slovenian Cup: 2009–10, 2011–12, 2012–13
Slovenian Supercup: 2012

References

External links
NZS profile 

1990 births
Living people
Sportspeople from Maribor
Slovenian footballers
Slovenian expatriate footballers
Association football goalkeepers
Slovenian PrvaLiga players
Slovenian Second League players
NK Maribor players
ND Mura 05 players
NK Rudar Velenje players
SV Allerheiligen players
Slovenia youth international footballers
Slovenia under-21 international footballers
Slovenian expatriate sportspeople in Austria
Expatriate footballers in Austria